Savaric may refer to:

 Savaric of Auxerre, bishop of Auxerre
 Savaric FitzGeldewin, bishop of Bath and Wells
 Savari de Mauléon or Savaric de Malleo, 13th century soldier and troubadour

See also
 Savary (disambiguation)